Pterinopelma is a genus of Brazilian tarantulas that was first described by Reginald Innes Pocock in 1901.  it contains three species, found in Brazil: P. felipeleitei, P. sazimai, and P. vitiosum. It was removed from the synonymy of Eupalaestrus in 2011.

Diagnosis
They resemble the Lasiodora, Vitalius, and Nhandu genera as they all lack accessory prolateral keels and by having an apical and sub apical palpal keel in males. They own a short spermathecae which is separated by a sclerotized area in females. Males can be distinguished by lack stridulating hairs on the prolateral coxae, and owning denticles in the inferior keel and weakly developed keels of the palpal bulb. Females can be distinguished by the absence of long hairs on the carapace, and having a sternum which is as wide as it is long, or being wider than longer.

See also
 List of Theraphosidae species

References

Theraphosidae genera
Spiders of Brazil
Taxa named by R. I. Pocock
Theraphosidae